Cheboygan is a city in the U.S. state of Michigan. As of the 2010 census, the city population was 4,876. It is the county seat of Cheboygan County.

The name of the city shares the name of the county and probably has its origin from the Cheboygan River, although the precise meaning is no longer known. It may have come from an Ojibwe word zhaabonigan meaning "sewing needle". Alternatively, the origin may have been "Chabwegan," meaning "a place of ore."

The city is at the mouth of the Cheboygan River on Lake Huron.

History

Cheboygan was originally an Ojibwe settlement. In 1844, Jacob Sammons, a cooper from Fort Mackinac, chose the old native camping ground (then called "Shabwegan") as the site for his cabin. He recruited other settlers, and a post office named "Duncan" was established in 1846. It was made the county seat in 1853.

Duncan or Duncan City was given a post office in 1850 as a result of the building of sawmills in this area. Duncan was made the county seat in 1853 and the location of the federal land office in 1855. The county seat shifted to Cheboygan in about 1870. Later Duncan was included within the expanded boundaries of Cheboygan.

The area became known as Cheboygan in 1870. It was incorporated as a village in 1871.  Rail maps in 1876 show planned rail service for Cheboygan, but due to various setbacks, rail did not arrive there until 1881. There was a theater built in town in 1877.

Cheboygan was incorporated as a city (versus a village) in 1889.

In approximately 1890, Cheboygan became the home port for ferryboats to nearby Bois Blanc, an island in the Straits of Mackinac. The Kristen D is a ferry which operates between Cheboygan and Bois Blanc Island. Early in the 20th century, it was home to the pioneering brass era cyclecar maker, Flagler.

In 1944, Cheboygan became the home port of the former U.S. Coast Guard cutter and icebreaker , serving from 1944 to 2006. Beginning in 2006, the port continued this role as the home dock of the new , a successor cutter.

Geography

Climate
The climate is described as Humid Continental by the Köppen Climate System, abbreviated as Dfb

Demographics

2010 census
As of the census of 2010, there were 4,867 people, 2,025 households, and 1,164 families residing in the city. The racial makeup of the city was 90.8% White, 1.0% African American, 4.6% Native American, 0.2% Asian, 0.2% from other races, and 3.2% from two or more races. Hispanic or Latino of any race were 1.2% of the population.

There were 2,025 households, of which 28.3% had children under the age of 18 living with them, 36.7% were married couples living together, 15.2% had a female householder with no husband present, 5.6% had a male householder with no wife present, and 42.5% were non-families. 35.9% of all households were made up of individuals, and 16.1% had someone living alone who was 65 years of age or older. The average household size was 2.23 and the average family size was 2.84.

The median age in the city was 40.8 years. 22.1% of residents were under the age of 18; 10.3% were between the ages of 18 and 24; 22.6% were from 25 to 44; 26% were from 45 to 64; and 19% were 65 years of age or older. The gender makeup of the city was 47.9% male and 52.1% female.

2000 census
As of the census of 2000, there were 5,295 people, 2,146 households, and 1,349 families residing in the city. The racial makeup of the city was 91.80% White, 0.51% African American, 4.12% Native American, 0.26% Asian, 0.02% Pacific Islander, 0.38% from other races, and 2.91% from two or more races. Hispanic or Latino of any race were 1.44% of the population.

There were 2,146 households, out of which 31.8% had children under the age of 18 living with them, 44.4% were married couples living together, 14.9% had a female householder with no husband present, and 37.1% were non-families. 31.6% of all households were made up of individuals, and 14.6% had someone living alone who was 65 years of age or older. The average household size was 2.35 and the average family size was 2.94.

In the city, the population was spread out, with 25.5% under the age of 18, 8.5% from 18 to 24, 27.0% from 25 to 44, 20.4% from 45 to 64, and 18.6% who were 65 years of age or older. The median age was 37 years. For every 100 females, there were 89.4 males. For every 100 females age 18 and over, there were 84.7 males.

The median income for a household in the city was $25,033, and the median income for a family was $32,692. Males had a median income of $28,417 versus $19,559 for females. The per capita income for the city was $14,318. About 15.8% of families and 19.9% of the population were below the poverty line, including 31.0% of those under age 18 and 9.1% of those age 65 or over.

Tourist attractions

 Bois Blanc Island
 Cheboygan Crib Light
 Cheboygan State Park
 Opera House

Media
The city and county are served by a daily newspaper, the Cheboygan Daily Tribune.  A television station, WTOM-TV, is licensed to Cheboygan and maintains broadcast facilities along US Highway 23 south of the city, but this station operates as a satellite, with programming originating from parent station WPBN-TV in Traverse City.

Transportation

State trunklines

County-designated highways

Trails
 North Central State Trail
 North Eastern State Trail

Bus
Indian Trails provides daily intercity bus service between St. Ignace and Bay City, Michigan. This route doubles as the Amtrak Thruway Motorcoach service for the area.

Notable people
George M. Humphrey, 55th United States Secretary of the Treasury
Debbie Massey, golfer. Winner of three LPGA Tour events
Scott Sigler, 1988 graduate of CAHS. Contemporary American author of science fiction and horror.

References

External links

City of Cheboygan
Cheboygan Area Chamber of Commerce
Cheboygan: Change in a Small Town 1844-2001
Website for the USCGC Mackinaw, home ported in Cheboygan

Cities in Cheboygan County, Michigan
County seats in Michigan
Populated places on Lake Huron in the United States
Populated places established in 1871
1871 establishments in Michigan